"Scribble" is a song by electronic group Underworld. It was released as the first single from their album Barking. The track, co-produced by High Contrast, was released as a digital single on 28 June 2010.

Music video
The video is directed by Toby Vogel, and it is a lo-fi video with live footage and band member Karl Hyde singing the song in a car, which is being driven down what looks to be the A13 around Newham.

Track list
 "Scribble" (Album Version)
 "Scribble" (Radio Edit)
 "Scribble" (Netsky Remix)

Charts

References

2010 singles
2010 songs
Songs written by Karl Hyde
Songs written by Rick Smith (musician)
Underworld (band) songs